Firsovo is a rural locality (a selo) in Sannikovsky Selsoviet, Pervomaysky District, Altai Krai, Russia. The population was 807 as of 2013. There are 80 streets.

Geography 
Firsovo is located 14 km south of Novoaltaysk (the district's administrative centre) by road. Firsovo-2 is the nearest rural locality.

References 

Rural localities in Pervomaysky District, Altai Krai